The men's 200 m time trial competition in road speed skating at the 2017 World Games took place on 24 July 2017 at the Millennium Park in Wrocław, Poland.

Competition format
A total of 20 athletes entered the competition. From qualifications 12 skaters qualify to final.

Results

Qualifications

Final

References 

 
2017 World Games